.ss is the designated country code top-level domain (ccTLD) for South Sudan in the Domain Name System of the Internet. It is derived from the ISO 3166-1 alpha-2 code for South Sudan, which is SS. According to CIO East Africa, the TLD was allocated on 10 August 2011 following the country's declaration of independence from Sudan. The TLD was registered on 31 August 2011, but not added to the DNS root zone and was thus not operational. It was approved at the ICANN Board meeting on 27 January 2019 and was added to the DNS root zone on 2 February 2019.

Before .ss was successfully registered, the country's Undersecretary for Telecommunications had initially been concerned about the ccTLD request's possible rejection due to SS also being an abbreviation for Schutzstaffel, the paramilitary force of Nazi Germany.

Before the independence of South Sudan, the applicable domain was .sd, Sudan's top-level Internet domain.

Registration of .ss domain names launched in three phases starting June 1, 2020, with general availability starting September 1, 2020.

Second-level domains
There also exist a number of second-level domains:
 .com.ss – open to all applicants (intended for commercial entities)
 .biz.ss – any business entity
 .net.ss – for network operators
 .org.ss – for South Sudan NGOs
 .edu.ss – for South Sudan higher educational institutions
 .sch.ss – for South Sudan secondary and primary schools
 .me.ss – for personal websites (name.me.ss)
 .gov.ss – for South Sudan government entities only

References

External links 
 ssNIC
 IANA database entry

Country code top-level domains
Telecommunications in South Sudan
Computer-related introductions in 2011